St. George Spirits is an artisanal distillery located in Alameda, California that produces a range of alcoholic beverages under the direction of Master Distiller Lance Winters. They are known for producing vodka, absinthe, whiskey, gin, brandy, liqueurs, and a range of exotic spirits.

History
St. George Spirits was founded in 1982 by Jorg Rupf as an eau de vie distillery. In 1996, Jorg Rupf hired Lance Winters, a brewer and former nuclear scientist. One year later, Jorg and Lance began distilling and aging their single malt whiskey, which was first released in 2000. In 2004, St. George Spirits moved into its current location, a  airplane hangar on the former Alameda naval air station.

In December 2007, the company released the first commercially available American absinthe, St. George Absinthe Verte, since the lifting of the 1912 ban on making the spirit. The recipe had been in development for 11 years prior to release, as the ban only applied to the commercial sale of the spirit (not development).

Jorg Rupf retired as master distiller in 2010. That same year, St. George sold their popular Hangar One Vodka line to Proximo Spirits to focus on new projects, including: gin, liqueurs,  malt whisky, agricole rum, and Breaking & Entering Whiskies. In 2015 they released a new line of three vodkas, and in 2016 they brought out Bruto Americano, a California Amaro.

In 2013, Maverick Drinks began distributing St. George Spirits in the UK. By 2018, St. George Spirits products were distributed in Canada, the UK, France, Germany, Italy, Austria, Switzerland, Belgium, Finland, China, Hong Kong, Australia, Singapore, Malaysia, Thailand, Bermuda, and Panama among others.

Products
Current Spirits

Gins
 Terroir Gin (45% ABV)
 Botanivore Gin (45% ABV)
 Dry Rye Gin (45% ABV)
 Dry Rye Reposado Gin (49.5% ABV)

Whiskeys
 St. George Single Malt Whiskey (43% ABV)
 Breaking & Entering (B&E) American Whiskey (43% ABV)
 Baller Single Malt Whiskey (47% ABV)

Vodkas
 St. George All Purpose Vodka (40% ABV)
 St. George California Citrus Vodka (40% ABV)
 St. George Green Chile Vodka (40% ABV)

Other liqueurs
 Absinthe Verte (60% ABV)
 Fruit Brandies; Pear, Raspberry, (Both 40% ABV) and Reserve Apple (43% ABV)
 Fruit Liqueurs; Raspberry and Spiced Pear (Both 20% ABV)
 NOLA Coffee Liqueur (25% ABV)
 Bruto Americano (Italian Style Amaro, 24% ABV)
 St George California Shochu (Japanese Style Whiskey, 40% ABV)
 Agua Perfecta Basil Eau De Vie (40% ABV)

Discontinued spirits
 Hangar One Vodka, now made solely by Proximo Spirits since 2014
 Agua Azul Agave Spirits
 Other experimental spirits known as "Flights of Fancy"

References

External links 
 St. George Spirits

Distilleries in California
Food and drink companies established in 1982
Whiskies of the United States
Absinthe
American vodkas
Rums
American rums
Rums of the Pacific Rim
Companies based in Alameda, California
Food and drink in the San Francisco Bay Area
1982 establishments in California